Darren Mullen (born 7 January 1998) is an Irish hurler who plays for Kilkenny Senior Championship club Ballyhale Shamrocks and at inter-county level with the Kilkenny senior hurling team. He usually lines out as a corner-back.

Honours

St. Kieran's College
All-Ireland Colleges Senior Hurling Championship (3): 2014, 2015, 2016
Leinster Colleges Senior Hurling Championship (2): 2015, 2016

Ballyhale Shamrocks
All-Ireland Senior Club Hurling Championship (2): 2019, 2020
Leinster Senior Club Hurling Championship (2): 2018, 2019
Kilkenny Senior Hurling Championship (2): 2018, 2019
Kilkenny Under-21 Hurling Championship (2): 2017, 2018
Kilkenny Minor Roinn A hurling Championship (1): 2016

Kilkenny
Leinster Under-21 Hurling Championship (1): 2017
All-Ireland Minor Hurling Championship (1): 2014
Leinster Minor Hurling Championship (2): 2014, 2015

References

1998 births
Living people
DCU hurlers
Ballyhale Shamrocks hurlers
Kilkenny inter-county hurlers